

Events

Pre-1600
1317 – The "Nyköping Banquet": King Birger of Sweden treacherously seizes his two brothers Valdemar, Duke of Finland and Eric, Duke of Södermanland, who were subsequently starved to death in the dungeon of Nyköping Castle.
1508 – The League of Cambrai is formed by Pope Julius II, Louis XII of France, Maximilian I, Holy Roman Emperor and Ferdinand II of Aragon as an alliance against Venice.
1520 – Martin Luther burns his copy of the papal bull Exsurge Domine outside Wittenberg's Elster Gate.
1541 – Thomas Culpeper and Francis Dereham are executed for having affairs with Catherine Howard, Queen of England and wife of Henry VIII.

1601–1900
1652 – Defeat at the Battle of Dungeness causes the Commonwealth of England to reform its navy.
1665 – The Royal Netherlands Marine Corps is founded by Michiel de Ruyter.
1684 – Isaac Newton's derivation of Kepler's laws from his theory of gravity, contained in the paper De motu corporum in gyrum, is read to the Royal Society by Edmond Halley.
1768 – The first edition of the Encyclopædia Britannica is published.
1799 – France adopts the metre as its official unit of length.
1817 – Mississippi becomes the 20th U.S. state.
1861 – American Civil War: The Confederate States of America accept a rival state government's pronouncement that declares Kentucky to be the 13th state of the Confederacy.
  1861   – Forces led by Nguyễn Trung Trực, an anti-colonial guerrilla leader in southern Vietnam, sink the French lorcha L'Esperance.
1864 – American Civil War: Sherman's March to the Sea: Major General William Tecumseh Sherman's Union Army troops reach the outer Confederate defenses of Savannah, Georgia.
1877 – Russo-Turkish War: The Russian Army captures Plevna after a 5-month siege. The garrison of 25,000 surviving Turks surrenders. The Russian victory is decisive for the outcome of the war and the Liberation of Bulgaria.
1896 – Alfred Jarry's Ubu Roi premieres in Paris. A riot breaks out at the end of the performance.
1898 – Spanish–American War: The Treaty of Paris is signed, officially ending the conflict. Spain cedes administration of Cuba to the United States, and the United States agrees to pay Spain $20 million for the Philippines.

1901–present
1901 – The first Nobel Prize ceremony is held in Stockholm on the fifth anniversary of Alfred Nobel's death.
1902 – The opening of the reservoir of the Aswan Dam in Egypt.
1906 – U.S. President Theodore Roosevelt is awarded the Nobel Peace Prize for his role in the mediation of the Russo-Japanese War, becoming the first American to win a Nobel Prize in any field.
1907 – The worst night of the Brown Dog riots in London, when 1,000 medical students, protesting against the existence of a memorial for animals that have been vivisected, clash with 400 police officers.
1909 – Selma Lagerlöf becomes the first female writer to receive the Nobel Prize in Literature.
1932 – Thailand becomes a constitutional monarchy.
1936 – Abdication Crisis: Edward VIII signs the Instrument of Abdication.
  1941   – World War II: Battle of the Philippines: Imperial Japanese forces under the command of General Masaharu Homma land on Luzon.
1942 – World War II: Government of Poland in exile send Raczyński's Note (the first official report on the Holocaust) to 26 governments who signed the Declaration by United Nations.
1948 – The Human Rights Convention is signed by the United Nations.
1949 – Chinese Civil War: The People's Liberation Army begins its siege of Chengdu, the last Kuomintang-held city in mainland China, forcing President of the Republic of China Chiang Kai-shek and his government to retreat to Taiwan.
1953 – British Prime Minister Winston Churchill receives the Nobel Prize in Literature.
1963 – Zanzibar gains independence from the United Kingdom as a constitutional monarchy, under Sultan Jamshid bin Abdullah.
  1963   – An assassination attempt on the British High Commissioner in Aden kills two people and wounds dozens more.
1968 – Japan's biggest heist, the still-unsolved "300 million yen robbery", is carried out in Tokyo.
1978 – Arab–Israeli conflict: Prime Minister of Israel Menachem Begin and President of Egypt Anwar Sadat are jointly awarded the Nobel Peace Prize.
1979 – Kaohsiung Incident: Taiwanese pro-democracy demonstrations are suppressed by the KMT dictatorship, and organizers are arrested.
1983 – Democracy is restored in Argentina with the inauguration of President Raúl Alfonsín.
1984 – United Nations General Assembly recognizes the Convention against Torture.
1989 – Mongolian Revolution: At the country's first open pro-democracy public demonstration, Tsakhiagiin Elbegdorj announces the establishment of the Mongolian Democratic Union.
1993 – The last shift leaves Wearmouth Colliery in Sunderland. The closure of the 156-year-old pit marks the end of the old County Durham coalfield, which had been in operation since the Middle Ages.
1994 – Rwandan genocide: Maurice Baril, military advisor to the U.N. Secretary-General and head of the Military Division of the Department of Peacekeeping Operations, recommends that UNAMIR stand down.
1995 – The Israeli army withdraws from Nablus pursuant to the terms of Oslo Accord.
1996 – The new Constitution of South Africa is promulgated by Nelson Mandela.
1999 – Helen Clark is sworn in as Prime Minister of New Zealand, the second woman to hold the post and the first following an election.
2005 – Sosoliso Airlines Flight 1145 crashes at Port Harcourt International Airport in Nigeria, killing 108 people.
2014 – Palestinian minister Ziad Abu Ein is killed after the suppression of a demonstration by Israeli forces in the village (Turmus'ayya) in Ramallah.
2015 – Rojava conflict: The Syrian Democratic Council is established in Dêrik, forming the political wing of the Syrian Democratic Forces in northeast Syria.
2016 – Two explosions outside a football stadium in Istanbul, Turkey, kill 38 people and injure 166 others.
2017 – ISIL is defeated in Iraq.
2019 – The Ostrava hospital attack in the Czech Republic results in eight deaths, including the perpetrator.
2021 – A widespread, deadly, and violent tornado outbreak slams the Central, Midwestern, and Southern regions of the United States. Eighty-nine people are killed by the tornadoes, with most of the fatalities occurring in Kentucky, where a single tornado kills 57 people, and injures hundreds of others.

Births

Pre-1600
 553 – Houzhu, emperor of the Chen dynasty (d. 604)
1376 – Edmund Mortimer, English nobleman and rebel (d. 1409)
1452 – Johannes Stöffler, German mathematician and astronomer (d. 1531)
1472 – Anne de Mowbray, 8th Countess of Norfolk (d. 1481)
1489 – Gaston of Foix, Duke of Nemours (d. 1512)
1588 – Isaac Beeckman, Dutch scientist and philosopher (d. 1637)

1601–1900
1610 – Adriaen van Ostade, Dutch painter (d. 1685)
1654 – Giovanni Gioseffo dal Sole, Italian painter (d. 1719)
1658 – Lancelot Blackburne, Archbishop of York (d. 1743)
1713 – Johann Nicolaus Mempel, German cantor and organist (d. 1747)
1751 – George Shaw, English botanist and zoologist (d. 1813)
1776 – Archduchess Maria Leopoldine of Austria-Este (d. 1848)
1783 – María Bibiana Benítez, Puerto Rican poet and playwright (d. 1873)
1787 – Thomas Hopkins Gallaudet, American educator, founded the American School for the Deaf (d. 1851)
1804 – Carl Gustav Jacob Jacobi, German mathematician and academic (d. 1851)
1805 – William Lloyd Garrison, American journalist and activist, founded The Liberator (d. 1879)
  1805   – Joseph Škoda, Czech physician, dermatologist, and academic (d. 1881)
1811 – Caroline Mehitable Fisher Sawyer, American poet, biographer, and editor (d. 1894)
1815 – Ada Lovelace, English mathematician and computer scientist (d. 1852)
1821 – Nikolay Nekrasov, Russian poet and critic (d. 1877)
1822 – César Franck, Belgian organist and composer (d. 1890)
1824 – George MacDonald, Scottish minister, author, and poet (d. 1905)
1827 – Eugene O'Keefe, Canadian businessman and philanthropist (d. 1913)
1830 – Emily Dickinson, American poet (d. 1886)
1851 – Melvil Dewey, American librarian, created the Dewey Decimal System (d. 1931)
1866 – Louis Bolk, Dutch anatomist and biologist (d. 1930)
1870 – Jadunath Sarkar, Indian historian (d. 1958)
  1870   – Adolf Loos, Austrian architect and theoretician (d. 1933)
  1870   – Pierre Louÿs, Belgian-French author and poet (d. 1925)
1878 – C. Rajagopalachari, Indian lawyer and politician, 45th Governor-General of India  (d. 1972)
1882 – Otto Neurath, Austrian sociologist and philosopher (d. 1945)
  1882   – Shigenori Tōgō, Japanese politician, 37th Japanese Minister for Foreign Affairs (d. 1950)
1883 – Giovanni Messe, Italian field marshal and politician (d. 1968)
1885 – Elizabeth Baker, American economist and academic (d. 1973)
  1885   – Marios Varvoglis, Greek composer and conductor (d. 1967)
1886 – Victor McLaglen, English-American actor (d. 1959) 
1889 – Ray Collins, American actor (d. 1965) 
1890 – László Bárdossy, Hungarian politician and diplomat, 33rd Prime Minister of Hungary (d. 1946)
1891 – Harold Alexander, 1st Earl Alexander of Tunis, English field marshal and politician, 17th Governor General of Canada (d. 1969)
  1891   – Arlie Mucks, American discus thrower and shot putter (d. 1967)
  1891   – Nelly Sachs, German-Swedish poet and playwright, Nobel Prize laureate (d. 1970)
1896 – Torsten Bergström, Swedish actor and director (d. 1948)

1901–present
1903 – Una Merkel, American actress (d. 1986)
1904 – Antonín Novotný, Czechoslovak politician, President of Czechoslovak Socialist Republic, General Secretary of the Communist Party of Czechoslovakia (d. 1975)
1906 – Jules Ladoumègue, French runner (d. 1973)
  1906   – Harold Adamson, American lyricist (d. 1980)
1907 – Rumer Godden, English author and poet (d. 1998)
  1907   – Lucien Laurent, French footballer and coach (d. 2005)
  1907   – Amedeo Nazzari, Italian actor (d. 1979)
1908 – Olivier Messiaen, French composer and ornithologist (d. 1992)
1909 – Hermes Pan, American dancer and choreographer (d. 1990)
1910 – Ambrosio Padilla, Filipino basketball player and politician (d. 1996)
1911 – Chet Huntley, American journalist (d. 1974)
1912 – Philip Hart, American lawyer and politician, 49th Lieutenant Governor of Michigan (d. 1976)
  1912   – René Toribio, Guadeloupean politician (d. 1990)
  1912   – Tetsuji Takechi, Japanese theatrical and film director, critic, and author (d. 1988)
1913 – Pannonica de Koenigswarter, English-American jazz patron and writer (d. 1988)
  1913   – Morton Gould, American pianist, composer, and conductor (d. 1996)
  1913   – Harry Locke, English actor (d. 1987)
  1913   – Ray Nance, American trumpeter, violinist, and singer (d. 1976)
1914 – Dorothy Lamour, American actress and singer (d. 1996)
1915 – Nicky Barr, Australian rugby player, soldier, and pilot (d. 2006)
1916 – Walt Arfons, American race car driver (d. 2013)
1918 – Anne Gwynne, American actress (d. 2003)
  1918   – Anatoli Tarasov, Russian ice hockey player and coach (d. 1995)
1919 – Alexander Courage, American composer and conductor (d. 2008)
1920 – Clarice Lispector, Ukrainian-Brazilian journalist and author (d. 1977)
  1920   – Reginald Rose, American screenwriter and producer (d. 2002)
1921 – Toh Chin Chye, Singaporean academic and politician, 1st Deputy Prime Minister of Singapore (d. 2012)
1922 – Agnes Nixon, American television writer and director (d. 2016)
1923 – Harold Gould, American actor (d. 2010)
  1923   – Clorindo Testa, Italian-Argentinian architect, designed the National Library of the Argentine Republic and Marriott Plaza Hotel (d. 2013)
1924 – Ken Albers, American singer and musician (d. 2007)
  1924   – Michael Manley, Jamaican pilot and politician, 4th Prime Minister of Jamaica (d. 1997)
1925 – Carolyn Kizer, American poet and academic (d. 2014)
1926 – Guitar Slim, American blues singer-songwriter and guitarist (d. 1959)
1927 – Bob Farrell, American businessman, founded Farrell's Ice Cream Parlour (d. 2015)
  1927   – Danny Matt, German-Israeli general (d. 2013)
1928 – Barbara Nichols, American actress (d. 1976)
1930 – Wayne D. Anderson, American baseball player and coach (d. 2013)
  1930   – Michael Jopling, Baron Jopling, English farmer and politician, Minister of Agriculture, Fisheries and Food
1931 – Peter Baker, English-South African footballer and manager (d. 2016)
1933 – Mako Iwamatsu, Japanese actor (d. 2006)
1933 – Philip R. Craig, American author (d. 2007)
1934 – Howard Martin Temin, American geneticist and academic, Nobel Prize laureate (d. 1994)
1935 – Terry Allcock, English footballer and cricketer
  1935   – Jaromil Jireš, Czech director and screenwriter (d. 2001)
1936 – Howard Smith, American journalist, director, and producer (d. 2014)
1938 – Bill Dunk, Australian golfer
  1938   – Yuri Temirkanov, Russian viola player and conductor
1939 – Dick Bavetta, American basketball player and referee
  1939   – Barry Cunliffe, English archaeologist and academic
1941 – Ken Campbell, English actor, director, and screenwriter (d. 2008)
  1941   – Fionnula Flanagan, Irish actress and producer
  1941   – Tommy Rettig, American child actor (d. 1996)
  1941   – Kyu Sakamoto, Japanese singer and actor (d. 1985)
1942 – Ann Gloag, Scottish nurse and businesswoman
1944 – Andris Bērziņš, Latvian businessman and politician, 8th President of Latvia
  1944   – John Birt, Baron Birt, English businessman
  1944   – Steve Renko, American baseball player
1945 – Mukhtar Altynbayev, Kazakhstani general and politician, 3rd Defence Minister of Kazakhstan
1946 – Douglas Kenney, American satirist (d. 1980)
1947 – Rasul Guliyev, Azerbaijani engineer and politician, 22nd Speaker of the National Assembly of Azerbaijan
1948 – Dušan Bajević, Bosnian footballer and manager
  1948   – Jessica Cleaves, American singer-songwriter (d. 2014)
  1948   – Jasuben Shilpi, Indian sculptor (d. 2013)
1949 – Yasmin Alibhai-Brown, Ugandan-English journalist and author
  1949   – David Perdue, American politician
1950 – John Boozman, American football player, lawyer, and politician
  1950   – Simon Owen, New Zealand golfer
1951 – Johnny Rodriguez, American country music singer-songwriter and guitarist
1952 – Clive Anderson, English lawyer and television host
  1952   – Susan Dey, American actress
  1952   – Greg Mortimer, Australian geologist and mountaineer 
  1952   – Greg Laurie, American author and pastor
  1952   – Paul Varul, Estonian lawyer and politician, 6th Estonian Minister of Justice
1953 – Chris Bury, American journalist and academic
1954 – Eudine Barriteau, Barbadian economist and academic
  1954   – Price Cobb, American race car driver and manager
  1954   – Jack Hues, English singer-songwriter and musician
1956 – Rod Blagojevich, American lawyer and politician, 40th Governor of Illinois
  1956   – Roberto Cassinelli, Italian lawyer and politician
  1956   – Jan van Dijk, Dutch footballer and manager
1957 – Michael Clarke Duncan, American actor (d. 2012)
  1957   – Paul Hardcastle, English composer and producer
  1957   – Prem Rawat, Indian-American guru and educator
1958 – Cornelia Funke, German-American author
  1958   – Kathryn Stott, English pianist and academic
1959 – Mark Aguirre, American basketball player and coach
  1959   – Kevin Ash, English journalist and author (d. 2013)
  1959   – Udi Aloni, American-Israeli director and author
  1959   – Wolf Hoffmann, German guitarist 
1960 – Kenneth Branagh, Northern Ireland-born English actor director, producer, and screenwriter
  1960   – Kōichi Satō, Japanese actor
1961 – Mark McKoy, Canadian hurdler and sprinter
  1961   – Nia Peeples, American singer and actress
1962 – Rakhat Aliyev, Kazakh politician and diplomat (d. 2015)
  1962   – John de Wolf, Dutch footballer and manager
1963 – Jahangir Khan, Pakistani squash player
1964 – Stephen Billington, English actor
  1964   – Stef Blok, Dutch banker and politician, Dutch Minister of the Interior
  1964   – Bobby Flay, American chef and author
  1964   – Edith González, Mexican actress (d. 2019)
1965 – Greg Giraldo, American lawyer, comedian, actor, and screenwriter (d. 2010)
  1965   – J Mascis, American singer-songwriter and guitarist 
  1965   – Stephanie Morgenstern, Swiss-Canadian actress, producer, and screenwriter
1966 – Rein Ahas, Estonian geographer and academic
  1966   – Robin Brooke, New Zealand rugby player
  1966   – Mel Rojas, Dominican baseball player
  1966   – Penelope Trunk, American writer
1968 – Yōko Oginome, Japanese singer, actress, and voice actress
1969 – Darren Berry, Australian cricketer and coach
  1969   – Rob Blake, Canadian ice hockey player and manager
1970 – Kevin Sharp, American singer-songwriter (d. 2014)
  1970   – Bryant Stith, American basketball player and coach
1972 – Brian Molko, British-Belgian singer-songwriter
  1972   – Donavon Frankenreiter, American surfer, singer-songwriter, and guitarist
1973 – Gabriela Spanic, Venezuelan actress 
1974 – Meg White, American drummer
1975 – Steve Bradley, American wrestler (d. 2008)
  1975   – Emmanuelle Chriqui, Canadian actress
  1975   – Josip Skoko, Australian footballer
1976 – Shane Byrne, English motorcycle racer 
1978 – Anna Jesień, Polish hurdler
  1978   – Summer Phoenix, American actress
1979 – Matt Bentley, American wrestler
  1979   – Iain Brunnschweiler, English cricketer
  1979   – Yang Jianping, Chinese recurve archer
1980 – Sarah Chang, American violinist
1981 – Taufik Batisah, Singaporean singer
  1981   – Fábio Rochemback, Brazilian footballer
1982 – Claudia Hoffmann, German sprinter
  1982   – Sultan Kösen, Turkish farmer, tallest living person
1983 – Xavier Samuel, Australian actor
1985 – Charlie Adam, Scottish footballer
  1985   – Trésor Mputu, Congolese footballer
  1985   – Raven-Symoné, American actress, singer, and dancer
  1985   – Lê Công Vinh, Vietnamese footballer
1986 – Kahlil Bell, American football player
1987 – Gonzalo Higuaín, French-Argentinian footballer
1988 – Wilfried Bony, Ivorian footballer 
  1988   – Neven Subotić, Serbian footballer
1989 – Marion Maréchal-Le Pen, French politician
  1989   – Tom Sexton, Australian-Irish rugby player
1990 – Kazenga LuaLua, Congolese-English footballer
  1990   – Sakiko Matsui, Japanese singer and actress 
  1990   – Shoya Tomizawa, Japanese motorcycle racer (d. 2010)
1994 – Richard Kennar, Samoan rugby league player
  1994   – Matti Klinga, Finnish footballer
1996 – Joe Burrow, American football player
  1996   – Kang Daniel, South Korean singer and entrepreneur
1997 – Viktoriia Savtsova, Ukrainian Paralympic swimmer
1998 – Lucia Bronzetti, Italian tennis player

Deaths

Pre-1600
 925 – Sancho I, king of Pamplona
 949 – Herman I, Duke of Swabia
 990 – Folcmar, bishop of Utrecht
1041 – Michael IV the Paphlagonian, Byzantine emperor (b. 1010)
1081 – Nikephoros III Botaneiates, deposed Byzantine Emperor (b. c.1002)
1113 – Radwan, ruler of Aleppo
1310 – Stephen I, Duke of Bavaria (b. 1271)
1454 – Ignatius Behnam Hadloyo, Syriac Orthodox Patriarch of Antioch.
1475 – Paolo Uccello, Italian painter (b. 1397)
1508 – René II, Duke of Lorraine (b. 1451)
1541 – Thomas Culpeper, English courtier (b. 1514)
  1541   – Francis Dereham, English courtier (b. c. 1513)
1561 – Caspar Schwenckfeld, German theologian and writer

1601–1900
1618 – Giulio Caccini, Italian composer and educator (b. 1551)
1626 – Edmund Gunter, English mathematician and academic (b. 1581)
1665 – Tarquinio Merula, Italian organist, violinist, and composer (b. 1594)
1736 – António Manoel de Vilhena, Portuguese soldier and politician (b. 1663)
1791 – Jacob Frank, Polish religious leader (b. 1726)
1831 – Thomas Johann Seebeck, German physicist and academic (b. 1770)
1850 – Józef Bem, Polish general and physicist (b. 1794)
  1850   – François Sulpice Beudant, French mineralogist and geologist (b. 1787)
1865 – Leopold I of Belgium (b. 1790)
1867 – Sakamoto Ryōma, Japanese samurai and politician (b. 1836)
1896 – Alfred Nobel, Swedish chemist and engineer, invented Dynamite and founded the Nobel Prize (b. 1833)

1901–present
1909 – Red Cloud, American tribal chief (of the Oglala nation) (b. 1822)
1911 – Joseph Dalton Hooker, English botanist and explorer (b. 1817)
1917 – Mackenzie Bowell, English-Canadian journalist and politician, 5th Prime Minister of Canada (b. 1823)
1920 – Horace Elgin Dodge, American businessman, co-founded Dodge  (b. 1868)
1922 – Clement Lindley Wragge, English meteorologist and author (b. 1852)
1926 – Nikola Pašić, Serbian politician, 46th Prime Minister of Serbia (b. 1845)
1928 – Charles Rennie Mackintosh, Scottish architect and painter (b. 1868)
1929 – Harry Crosby, American publisher and poet (b. 1898)
1932 – Joseph Carruthers, Australian politician, 16th Premier of New South Wales (b. 1857)
1936 – Bobby Abel, English cricketer (b. 1857)
  1936   – Luigi Pirandello, Italian dramatist, novelist, and poet Nobel Prize laureate (b. 1867)
1939 – John Grieb, American gymnast and triathlete (b. 1879)
1941 – Colin Kelly, American captain and pilot (b. 1915)
1944 – John Brunt, English captain, Victoria Cross recipient (b. 1922)
1945 – Theodor Dannecker, German captain (b. 1913)
1946 – Walter Johnson, American baseball player, manager, and sportscaster (b. 1887)
  1946   – Damon Runyon, American newspaperman and short story writer (b. 1884)
1948 – Na Hye-sok, South Korean journalist, poet, and painter (b. 1896)
1951 – Algernon Blackwood, English author and playwright (b. 1869)
1953 – Abdullah Yusuf Ali, Indian-English scholar and translator (b. 1872)
1956 – David Shimoni, Russian-Israeli poet and translator (b. 1891)
1957 – Napoleon Zervas, Greek general (b. 1891)
1958 – Adolfo Camarillo, American horse breeder, rancher, and philanthropist (b. 1864)
1963 – K. M. Panikkar, Indian historian and diplomat (b. 1894)
1967 – Otis Redding, American singer-songwriter and producer (b. 1941)
1968 – Karl Barth, Swiss theologian and author (b. 1886)
  1968   – George Forrest, Northern Irish lawyer and politician (b. 1921)
  1968   – Thomas Merton, American monk and author (b. 1915)
1972 – Mark Van Doren, American poet, critic, and academic (b. 1894)
1973 – Wolf V. Vishniac, German-American microbiologist and academic (b. 1922)
1974 – Toshinari Shōji, Japanese general (b. 1890)
1977 – Adolph Rupp, American basketball player and coach (b. 1901)
1978 – Ed Wood, American director, producer, and screenwriter (b. 1924)
1979 – Ann Dvorak, American actress (b. 1911)
1982 – Freeman Gosden, American actor and screenwriter (b. 1899)
1987 – Jascha Heifetz, Lithuanian-American violinist and educator (b. 1901)
1988 – Richard S. Castellano, American actor (b. 1933)
  1988   – Johnny Lawrence, English cricketer and coach (b. 1911)
  1988   – Dorothy de Rothschild, English philanthropist and activist (b. 1895)
1990 – Armand Hammer, American businessman, founded Occidental Petroleum (b. 1898)
1991 – Greta Kempton, Austrian-American painter and academic (b. 1901)
1992 – Dan Maskell, English tennis player and sportscaster (b. 1908)
1993 – Alice Tully, American soprano (b. 1902)
1994 – Keith Joseph, English lawyer and politician, Secretary of State for Education (b. 1918)
  1994   – Alex Wilson, Canadian-American sprinter (b. 1905)
1995 – Darren Robinson, American rapper (b. 1967)
1996 – Faron Young, American singer-songwriter, guitarist, and actor (b. 1932)
1999 – Rick Danko, Canadian singer-songwriter, bass player, and producer (b. 1943)
  1999   – Franjo Tuđman, Croatian general and politician, 1st President of Croatia (b. 1922)
  1999   – Woodrow Borah, American historian of Spanish America (b. 1912)
2000 – Marie Windsor, American actress (b. 1919)
2001 – Ashok Kumar, Indian actor, singer, and producer (b. 1911)
2002 – Andres Küng, Swedish journalist and politician (b. 1945)
  2002   – Ian MacNaughton, Scottish actor, director, and producer (b. 1925)
2003 – Sean McClory, Irish actor and director (b. 1924)
2004 – Gary Webb, American journalist and author (b. 1955)
2005 – Mary Jackson, American actress (b. 1910)
  2005   – Eugene McCarthy, American poet, academic, and politician (b. 1916)
  2005   – Richard Pryor, American comedian, actor, producer, and screenwriter (b. 1940)
2006 – Olivia Coolidge, English-American author and educator (b. 1908)
  2006   – Augusto Pinochet, Chilean general and dictator, 30th President of Chile (b. 1915)
2007 – Vitali Hakko, Turkish businessman, founded Vakko (b. 1913)
2009 – Vladimir Teplyakov, Russian soldier and physicist (b. 1925)
2010 – John Fenn, American chemist and academic, Nobel Prize laureate (b. 1917)
  2010   – J. Michael Hagopian, Armenian-American director, producer, and screenwriter (b. 1913)
  2010   – MacKenzie Miller, American horse trainer and breeder (b. 1921)
2012 – Iajuddin Ahmed, Bangladeshi academic and politician, 13th President of Bangladesh (b. 1931)
  2012   – Antonio Cubillo, Spanish lawyer and politician (b. 1930)
  2012   – Tommy Roberts, English fashion designer (b. 1942)
2013 – Alan Coleman, English-Australian director, producer, and screenwriter (b. 1936)
  2013   – Jim Hall, American guitarist and composer (b. 1930)
  2013   – Don Lund, American baseball player and coach (b. 1923)
  2013   – Srikanta Wadiyar, Indian politician and the titular Maharaja of Mysore(b. 1946)
2014 – Ralph Giordano, German author and publicist (b. 1923)
  2014   – Robert B. Oakley, American diplomat, 19th United States Ambassador to Pakistan (b. 1931)
  2014   – Bob Solinger, Canadian ice hockey player (b. 1925)
  2014   – Judy Baar Topinka, American journalist and politician (b. 1944)
  2014   – Gerard Vianen, Dutch cyclist (b. 1944)
2015 – Ron Bouchard, American race car driver and businessman (b. 1948)
  2015   – Denis Héroux, Canadian director and producer (b. 1940)
  2015   – Arnold Peralta, Honduran footballer (b. 1989)
  2015   – Dolph Schayes, American basketball player and coach (b. 1928)
2017 – Bruce Brown, American filmmaker (b. 1937)
  2017   – Max Clifford, British publicist (b. 1943)
  2017   – Charles M. Green Jr., American Internet personality (b. 1950)
  2017   – Curtis W. Harris, American minister (b. 1924)
2019 – Philip McKeon, American actor (b. 1964)
  2019   – Gershon Kingsley, American composer and musician (b. 1922)
  2019   – Emily Mason, American painter (b. 1932)
2020 – Tommy "Tiny" Lister Jr., American actor and wrestler (b. 1958)
  2020   – Joseph Safra, Lebanese-Brazilian financier (b.1938)
  2020   – Carol Sutton, American actress (b. 1944)
  2020   – Barbara Windsor, English actress (b. 1937)
2021 – Michael Nesmith, American musician (The Monkees), songwriter, actor, producer, and novelist (b. 1942)

Holidays and observances
Alfred Nobel Day or Nobeldagen (Sweden)
Christian feast day:
Behnam, Sarah, and the Forty Martyrs (Syriac Orthodox Church)
Eulalia of Mérida 
Karl Barth (Episcopal Church (USA))
Thomas Merton (Episcopal Church (USA))
Translation of the Holy House of Loreto
December 10 (Eastern Orthodox liturgics)
Constitution Day (Thailand)
Human Rights Day (International)

References

External links

 BBC: On This Day
 
 Historical Events on December 10

Days of the year
December